The Cauchy distribution, named after Augustin Cauchy, is a continuous probability distribution. It is also known, especially among physicists, as the Lorentz distribution (after Hendrik Lorentz), Cauchy–Lorentz distribution, Lorentz(ian) function, or Breit–Wigner distribution. It is also the distribution of the ratio of two independent normally distributed random variables with mean zero.

The Cauchy distribution does not have finite moments of order greater than or equal to one; only fractional absolute moments exist. The Cauchy distribution has no moment generating function.

In mathematics, it is closely related to the Poisson kernel, which is the fundamental solution for the Laplace equation in the upper half-plane.

It is one of the few distributions that is stable and has a probability density function that can be expressed analytically, the others being the normal distribution and the Lévy distribution.

History

A function with the form of the density function of the Cauchy distribution was studied geometrically by Fermat in 1659, and later was known as the witch of Agnesi, after Agnesi included it as an example in her 1748 calculus textbook. Despite its name, the first explicit analysis of the properties of the Cauchy distribution was published by the French mathematician Poisson in 1824, with Cauchy only becoming associated with it during an academic controversy in 1853. Poisson noted that if the mean of observations following such a distribution were taken, the mean error did not converge to any finite number. As such, Laplace's use of the central limit theorem with such distribution was inappropriate, as it assumed a finite mean and variance. Despite this, Poisson did not regard the issue as important, in contrast to Bienaymé, who was to engage Cauchy in a long dispute over the matter.

Characterization

Probability density function
The Cauchy distribution has the probability density function (PDF)

Augustin-Louis Cauchy exploited such a density function in 1827 with an infinitesimal scale parameter, defining what would now be called a Dirac delta function.

It is sometimes convenient to express the PDF  in terms of the complex parameter 

In physics, a three-parameter Lorentzian function is often used:

where  is the height of the peak. The three-parameter Lorentzian function indicated is not, in general, a probability density function, since it does not integrate to 1, except in the special case where

Cumulative distribution function
The cumulative distribution function of the Cauchy distribution is:

and the quantile function (inverse cdf) of the Cauchy distribution is

For the standard distribution, the cumulative distribution function simplifies to arctangent function :

Entropy 

The entropy of the Cauchy distribution is given by:

 

The derivative of the quantile function, the quantile density function, for the Cauchy distribution is:

The differential entropy of a distribution can be defined in terms of its quantile density, specifically:

The Cauchy distribution is the maximum entropy probability distribution for a random variate  for which

or, alternatively, for a random variate  for which

In its standard form, it is the maximum entropy probability distribution for a random variate  for which

Kullback-Leibler divergence

The Kullback-Leibler divergence between two Cauchy distributions has the following symmetric closed-form formula:

Any f-divergence between two Cauchy distributions is symmetric and can be expressed as a function of the chi-squared divergence.
Closed-form expression for the total variation, Jensen–Shannon divergence, Hellinger distance, etc are available.

Properties
The Cauchy distribution is an example of a distribution which has no mean, variance or higher moments defined.

If  are independent and identically distributed random variables, each with a standard Cauchy distribution, then the sample mean  has the same standard Cauchy distribution. To see that this is true, compute the characteristic function of the sample mean:

where  is the sample mean. This example serves to show that the condition of finite variance in the central limit theorem cannot be dropped. It is also an example of a more generalized version of the central limit theorem that is characteristic of all stable distributions, of which the Cauchy distribution is a special case.

The Cauchy distribution is an infinitely divisible probability distribution. It is also a strictly stable distribution.

The standard Cauchy distribution coincides with the Student's t-distribution with one degree of freedom.

Like all stable distributions, the location-scale family to which the Cauchy distribution belongs is closed under linear transformations with real coefficients. In addition, the Cauchy distribution is closed under linear fractional transformations with real coefficients. In this connection, see also McCullagh's parametrization of the Cauchy distributions.

Characteristic function
Let  denote a Cauchy distributed random variable. The characteristic function of the Cauchy distribution is given by

which is just the Fourier transform of the probability density. The original probability density may be expressed in terms of the characteristic function, essentially by using the inverse Fourier transform:

Observe that the characteristic function is not differentiable at the origin: this corresponds to the fact that the Cauchy distribution does not have well-defined moments higher than the zeroth moment.

Comparison with the normal distribution
Compared to the normal distribution, the Cauchy density function has a higher peak and lower tails. 
An example is shown in the two figures added here

The figure to the left shows the Cauchy probability density function fitted to an observed histogram. The peak of the function is higher than the peak of the histogram while the tails are lower than those of the histogram. 
The figure to the right shows the normal probability density function fitted to the same observed histogram. The peak of the function is lower than the peak of the histogram. 
This illustrates the above statement.

Explanation of undefined moments

Mean
If a probability distribution has a density function , then the mean, if it exists, is given by

We may evaluate this two-sided improper integral by computing the sum of two one-sided improper integrals. That is,

for an arbitrary real number .

For the integral to exist (even as an infinite value), at least one of the terms in this sum should be finite, or both should be infinite and have the same sign. But in the case of the Cauchy distribution, both the terms in this sum are infinite and have opposite sign. Hence is undefined, and thus so is the mean.

Note that the Cauchy principal value of the mean of the Cauchy distribution is

which is zero. On the other hand, the related integral

is not zero, as can be seen by computing the integral. This again shows that the mean cannot exist.

Various results in probability theory about expected values, such as the strong law of large numbers, fail to hold for the Cauchy distribution.

Smaller moments

For  we have

Higher moments
The Cauchy distribution does not have finite moments of any order.  Some of the higher raw moments do exist and have a value of infinity, for example, the raw second moment:

 

By re-arranging the formula, one can see that the second moment is essentially the infinite integral of a constant (here 1).  Higher even-powered raw moments will also evaluate to infinity.  Odd-powered raw moments, however, are undefined, which is distinctly different from existing with the value of infinity. The odd-powered raw moments are undefined because their values are essentially equivalent to  since the two halves of the integral both diverge and have opposite signs.  The first raw moment is the mean, which, being odd, does not exist. (See also the discussion above about this.) This in turn means that all of the central moments and standardized moments are undefined since they are all based on the mean.  The variance—which is the second central moment—is likewise non-existent (despite the fact that the raw second moment exists with the value infinity).

The results for higher moments follow from Hölder's inequality, which implies that higher moments (or halves of moments) diverge if lower ones do.

Moments of truncated distributions
Consider the truncated distribution defined by restricting the standard Cauchy distribution to the interval . Such a truncated distribution has all moments (and the central limit theorem applies for i.i.d. observations from it); yet for almost all practical purposes it behaves like a Cauchy distribution.

Estimation of parameters 
Because the parameters of the Cauchy distribution do not correspond to a mean and variance, attempting to estimate the parameters of the Cauchy distribution by using a sample mean and a sample variance will not succeed. For example, if an i.i.d. sample of size n is taken from a Cauchy distribution, one may calculate the sample mean as:

Although the sample values  will be concentrated about the central value , the sample mean will become increasingly variable as more observations are taken, because of the increased probability of encountering sample points with a large absolute value. Similarly, calculating the sample variance will result in values that grow larger as more observations are taken.

Therefore, more robust means of estimating the central value  and the scaling parameter  are needed. Other, more precise and robust methods have been developed   For example, the truncated mean of the middle 24% of the sample order statistics produces an estimate for  that is more efficient than using either the sample median or the full sample mean. However, because of the fat tails of the Cauchy distribution, the efficiency of the estimator decreases if more than 24% of the sample is used.

However, this tends to be complicated by the fact that this requires finding the roots of a high degree polynomial, and there can be multiple roots that represent local maxima. Also, while the maximum likelihood estimator is asymptotically efficient, it is relatively inefficient for small samples. The log-likelihood function for the Cauchy distribution for sample size  is:

Note that

Solving just for  requires solving a polynomial of degree , and solving just for  requires solving a polynomial of degree . Therefore, whether solving for one parameter or for both parameters simultaneously, a numerical solution on a computer is typically required. The benefit of maximum likelihood estimation is asymptotic efficiency; estimating  using the sample median is only about 81% as asymptotically efficient as estimating  by maximum likelihood.

The shape can be estimated using the median of absolute values, since for location 0 Cauchy variables , the  the shape parameter.

Generating values from Cauchy distribution

Alternatively, the ratio of two standard normally distributed samples is a Cauchy sample.

Multivariate Cauchy distribution
A random vector  is said to have the multivariate Cauchy distribution if every linear combination of its components  has a Cauchy distribution. That is, for any constant vector , the random variable  should have a univariate Cauchy distribution.  The characteristic function of a multivariate Cauchy distribution is given by:

More formally:

for all .

An example of a bivariate Cauchy distribution can be given by:

We also can write this formula for complex variable. Then the probability density function of complex cauchy is :

Analogous to the univariate density, the multidimensional Cauchy density also relates to the multivariate Student distribution. They are equivalent when the degrees of freedom parameter is equal to one. The density of a  dimension Student distribution with one degree of freedom becomes:

Properties and details for this density can be obtained by taking it as a particular case of the multivariate Student density.

Transformation properties
If  then 
If  then 
McCullagh's parametrization of the Cauchy distributions: Expressing a Cauchy distribution in terms of one complex parameter , define  to mean .
 Using the same convention as above, if  then: where  is the circular Cauchy distribution.

Lévy measure 
The Cauchy distribution is the stable distribution of index 1.

 

where

and  can be expressed explicitly. In the case  of the Cauchy distribution, one has .

This last representation is a consequence of the formula

Related distributions
 Student's t distribution
 non-standardized Student's t distribution
If  independent, then 
If  then 
If  then 
If   then  
The Cauchy distribution is a limiting case of a Pearson distribution of type 4
The Cauchy distribution is a special case of a Pearson distribution of type 7.
The Cauchy distribution is a stable distribution: if , then .
The Cauchy distribution is a singular limit of a hyperbolic distribution
The wrapped Cauchy distribution, taking values on a circle, is derived from the Cauchy distribution by wrapping it around the circle.
For half-Cauchy distributions, the relation holds by setting .

Relativistic Breit–Wigner distribution

In nuclear and particle physics, the energy profile of a resonance is described by the relativistic Breit–Wigner distribution, while the Cauchy distribution is the (non-relativistic) Breit–Wigner distribution.

Occurrence and applications

In spectroscopy, the Cauchy distribution describes the shape of spectral lines which are subject to homogeneous broadening in which all atoms interact in the same way with the frequency range contained in the line shape. Many mechanisms cause homogeneous broadening, most notably collision broadening.  Lifetime or natural broadening also gives rise to a line shape described by the Cauchy distribution.
Applications of the Cauchy distribution or its transformation can be found in fields working with exponential growth.

The Cauchy distribution is often the distribution of observations for objects that are spinning.  The classic reference for this is called the Gull's lighthouse problem and as in the above section as the Breit–Wigner distribution in particle physics.
In hydrology the Cauchy distribution is applied to extreme events such as annual maximum one-day rainfalls and river discharges. The blue picture illustrates an example of fitting the Cauchy distribution to ranked monthly maximum one-day rainfalls showing also the 90% confidence belt based on the binomial distribution. The rainfall data are represented by plotting positions as part of the cumulative frequency analysis.
The expression for imaginary part of complex electrical permittivity according to Lorentz model is a model VAR (value at risk) producing a much larger probability of extreme risk than Gaussian Distribution.

See also
 Lévy flight and Lévy process
 Laplace distribution, the Fourier transform of the Cauchy distribution
 Cauchy process
 Stable process
 Slash distribution

References

External links
 
 Earliest Uses: The entry on Cauchy distribution has some historical information.
 
 GNU Scientific Library – Reference Manual
 Ratios of Normal Variables by George Marsaglia

Augustin-Louis Cauchy
Continuous distributions
Probability distributions with non-finite variance
Power laws
Stable distributions
Location-scale family probability distributions